The World Blackjack Tour is an original GSN program that premiered September 4, 2006. Broadcast from the Las Vegas Hilton, five players representing five different nations play 21 hands of blackjack for a first prize of $10,000. The show is hosted by John Fugelsang and Ben Mezrich. In the course of the debut broadcast the hosts announced plans to take the World Blackjack Tour to casinos around the globe.

Results

See also
Elimination Blackjack

Television shows about blackjack
Game Show Network original programming
2006 American television series debuts
Westgate Las Vegas